Bye Bye Blues is a 1989 Canadian film. It was written and directed by Anne Wheeler and produced by Alberta Motion Picture Development Corporation with the assistance of Allarcom Limited.

Plot

During World War II, Daisy Cooper (Rebecca Jenkins) returns home to her small Alberta town after she and her soldier husband, Teddy (Michael Ontkean), are split by the Japanese invasion of Hong Kong. While waiting for the war to end and to learn if Teddy is alive or dead, she joins a swing band as a singer to provide for her family, performing with them in many community halls.  Daisy and her children initially live with her husband's parents, but later rent a house for themselves, as Daisy chafes under her in-laws' scrutiny. Daisy struggles to balance societal expectations of fealty and commitment to her children, while also struggling to financially support herself and her children by travelling and performing with the band. A trombonist in the band has a secret past and a not so secret yearning. Daisy struggles with an impossible choice as she hears that Teddy is returning home.

Her husband's sister, a somewhat similar free spirit, befriends an Australian airman in Alberta to train in the British Commonwealth Air Training Plan.

Cast
The cast also includes Luke Reilly, Leslie Yeo, Kate Reid, Wayne Robson, Robyn Stevan, and Stuart Margolin.

Awards
The film was nominated for twelve Genie Awards at the 11th Genie Awards in 1990, and won three: Best Actress (Jenkins), Best Supporting Actress (Stevan), and Best Original Song ("When I Sing" by Bill Henderson).

Soundtrack
 Main Title
 Jazz Spring 	
 Theme For Teddy 	
 Marry Me Daisy 	
 When I Sing 	
 India 	
 Sweet Georgia Brown 	
 Max's Theme (I Love You Daisy) 	
 Am I Blue 	
 Bath Blues 	
 Unfinished Blues 	
 Who's Sorry Now 	
 Home Movie/It's A Plane 	
 You Made Me Love You 	
 Blues For Anne 	
 Bye Bye Blues

Credits
 Rebecca Jenkins - vocals
 Produced by Bob Hunka, John McCullough, and George Blondheim
 Music preparation by Laurie Bardsley
 Original film music composed and conducted by George Blondheim
 Mixed by Gary Dere, Paul Shubat, and Hayward Parrott
 Musicians: George Blondheim - piano, Mike Lent - bass, Bob McLaren - drums, Gene Bertoncini - guitar, Bob Stroup - trombone, P.J. Perry - clarinet and saxophone, Gary Guthman - trumpet, Vinod Bhardwaj - bansuri, Damyanti Bhardwaj - tanpura, Hari Sahay - tabla, George Ursan - drums ("When I Sing" and "Sweet Georgia Brown"), Melvin Wilson - guitar ("When I Sing"), Gary Koliger - guitar ("Sweet Georgia Brown"), Wayne Robson - background vocal ("When I Sing"), Wayne Robson, George Blondheim, Luke Reilly, and Stuart Margolin - vocal shouts ("Sweet Georgia Brown")
 Members of the Edmonton Symphony Orchestra: James Keene, Broderick Olson, Tom Johnson, Mary Johnson, Richard Caldwell, Hugh Davies, Stephen Bryant, Evan Verchomin, Andrew Bacon, Susan Ekholm, Derek Gomez, Tanya Prochzaka, Nora Bumanis, Colin Ryan, David Hoyt, Donald Plumb, Brian Jones, Susan Flook, Neria Mayer, Mikkio Kohjitani, John Taylor, Donald Hyder

Trivia
Springwater School in Starland County, Alberta, Canada was used as a set.
There are a number of buildings in Alberta's Ghost Town - Rowley, Alberta. 
This town's buildings were refaced and looks like a Hollywood movie set - hence its nickname Rowleywood.

Copyright status
For several years Bye Bye Blues could not be exhibited on television or theatrically (and could not be issued on DVD or made available digitally) because nobody could determine who held the copyright. On August 21, 2013, however, the Copyright Board of Canada issued a licence to Rebecca Jenkins, allowing the film to be distributed in Canada by television, Internet, and other means. The licence was issued under section 77 of the Copyright Act, which allows the Copyright Board to issue a licence in respect of orphan works where "the Board is satisfied that the applicant has made reasonable efforts to locate the owner of the copyright and that the owner cannot be located". Pursuant to the licence, the film is available online in Canada through the iTunes Store, and two theatrical screenings were held in October 2014 at the Vancouver International Film Festival.

References

External links
 Canadian Film Encyclopedia, at The Film Reference Library (a division of the Toronto International Film Festival Group)
 
 Soundtrack samples

1989 films
1989 independent films
English-language Canadian films
Films directed by Anne Wheeler
Films set in the Canadian Prairies
Films shot in Edmonton
Canadian independent films
1989 romantic drama films
Canadian musical drama films
1980s musical drama films
Canadian romantic drama films
Jazz films
Films set in Alberta
1980s English-language films
1980s Canadian films